The Germany Davis Cup team represents Germany in Davis Cup tennis competition and are governed by the Deutscher Tennis Bund. As East Germany never participated in the Davis Cup, and the Deutscher Tennisbund remained the same organization throughout the century, the West German Davis Cup team is included in this article.

Germany has won the Davis Cup three times (1988, 1989, 1993) and finished as runners-up twice (1970, 1985).

Current team

Statistics correct as of 5 February 2023. Rankings are as of 30 January 2023.

History
Germany competed in its first Davis Cup in 1913. Since then they have reached five finals.

First final participation in 1970
In 1970, Germany reached the Davis Cup final for the first time. Having defeated Denmark, Egypt, Belgium and the Soviet Union in the European zone they played India and Spain in the so-called interzonal zone, beating both teams. In the final Wilhelm Bungert and Christian Kuhnke played Arthur Ashe and Cliff Richey in singles, and Bob Lutz/Stan Smith in doubles. The German players lost all five matches, all but one in three sets.

Second final participation in 1985
Fifteen years later Germany reached the Davis Cup final for the second time. After close successes against Spain and the United States and a clear victory against Czechoslovakia in the World Group Germany played Sweden at home in Munich. Germany played with Boris Becker and Michael Westphal in the singles and with Becker/Andreas Maurer in the double. After the fourth rubber against Mats Wilander and Stefan Edberg in the singles and Wilander/Joakim Nyström in the double the standings were 2–2. In the decisive fifth rubber Westphal lost to Stefan Edberg in four sets.

First Davis Cup title in 1988
Only three years later Germany reached the Davis Cup final for the third time. After three 5–0 whitewashes against Brazil, Denmark and Yugoslavia Germany once again met Sweden. Now it was Sweden's turn to lose at home. Germany secured its triumph in the third match, the double. Carl-Uwe Steeb and Boris Becker had defeated Mats Wilander and Stefan Edberg, respectively, before the German double consisting of Becker and Eric Jelen defeated Edberg and Anders Järryd in five sets. The fourth match which was shortened to best of three was won by Edberg before Sweden let Germany get its fourth point by a walkover.

Second Davis Cup title in 1989
Germany defeated Indonesia, Czechoslovakia and the United States on the way to their second consecutive final and the final once again was Germany against Sweden. This time the final took place in Stuttgart. Mats Wilander achieved the 1–0 lead for Sweden by defeating Carl-Uwe Steeb in five sets before Boris Becker levelled the standings in a three-set victory against Stefan Edberg. Becker and Eric Jelen defeated the Sweden double of Jan Gunnarsson and Anders Järryd in five sets before Becker secured the second consecutive German Davis Cup title by defeating Mats Wilander in three sets.

Third Davis Cup title in 1993
It took Germany four years to reach the Davis Cup final for the fifth time, and they did so by beating Russia, the Czech Republic and – once again – Sweden. In the final against Australia that took place in Düsseldorf, Germany, Michael Stich defeated Jason Stoltenberg in five sets to mark the first point for Germany. In the second Friday single, Marc-Kevin Goellner lost to Richard Fromberg with a result of 7–9 in the fifth set. Stich and Patrik Kühnen defeated their Australian counterparts Todd Woodbridge and Mark Woodforde in the double, marking the 2–1 for Germany. In the fourth rubber, Michael Stich clearly defeated Richard Fromberg in three sets before Goellner defeated Stoltenberg in the tie-break of the third and last set.

Results

Results until 1980

Germany (1900–1960)

West Germany (1960–1980)

Recent performances
Here is the list of all match-ups since 1981, when the competition started being held in the World Group format.

1980s

1990s

2000s

2010s

2020s

Team captains

from 1985 on
 Wilhelm Bungert (1985–1986)
 Niki Pilić (1987–1996)
 Boris Becker (1997–1999)
 Carl-Uwe Steeb (1999–2001)
 Michael Stich (2001–2003)
 Patrik Kühnen (2003−2012)
 Carsten Arriens (2013−2014)
 Michael Kohlmann (2015−present)

Statistics

Player records

Team records
Statistics since 1981, as of end of 2023 Davis Cup qualifying round.
Results
Champion: 3 times
Runner-up: 1 time
Lost in semifinals: 5 times
Lost in quarterfinals: 12 times
Lost in first round: 17 times
Lost in qualifying round: 1 time
Not in World Group: 3 times

Records by decade
1981–1989: 18–7 (72%)
1990–1999: 16–9 (64%)
2000–2009: 11–10 (52%)
2010–2019: 12–10 (55%)
2020–: 8–3 (73%)

Records by ground
Home (55 ties): 40–15 (73%)
Away (42 ties): 21–21 (50%)
Neutral (7 ties): 4–3 (57%)
Total: (104 ties): 65–39 (63%)

Head-to-head records
Statistics since 1981, as of end of 2023 Davis Cup qualifying round.

Records against countries

Records against Davis Cup zones

See also

List of Germany Davis Cup team representatives
Davis Cup
Tennis in Germany
Germany Billie Jean King Cup team
Germany at the Hopman Cup

References

External links

Davis Cup teams
Davis Cup